Paramaevia poultoni is a species of jumping spider in the family Salticidae. It is found in the United States and Mexico.

References

Salticidae
Spiders described in 1901